Tridrepana examplata is a moth in the family Drepanidae. It was described by Warren in 1922. It is widely distributed in New Guinea, where it is especially common in mountainous areas.

The wingspan is about 38-46.2 mm for males and 41.2–51 mm for females.

References

Moths described in 1922
Drepaninae